Elections were held on November 12, 1991 in the Regional Municipality of Ottawa-Carleton. This page lists the election results for Regional Chair, local mayors and councils of the RMOC in 1991. The 1991 election was the first direct election for a regional chair of the board.

Regional Chair of Ottawa-Carleton

Regional Council
The Ottawa-Carleton Regional Council was made up of 33 various elected positions across the region.

Cumberland
Mayoral race

Council

Gloucester
Mayoral race

Council

Goulbourn
Mayoral race

Council

Kanata
Mayoral race

Council

Nepean
Mayoral race

Council

Osgoode
Mayoral race

Council
Four elected at large. Elected councillors indicated in bold.

Ottawa

Mayoral race

Rideau
Mayoral race

Council

Rockcliffe Park
Mayoral race

Council
Four elected at large. Elected councillors indicated in bold.

Vanier
Mayoral race

Council

West Carleton
Mayoral race

Council

References

Sources
''Ottawa Citizen, November 14, 1991, pg B2

Municipal elections in Ottawa
1991 Ontario municipal elections